MV Mesabi Miner is a bulk carrier that operates on the upper four North American Great Lakes.
She is one of the small number of vessels that are too large to travel through the Welland Canal that connects Lake Erie to the lowest lake, Lake Ontario.

History 
The American Ship Building Company built the ship in 1975 at Lorain, Ohio.  Like her sister ships, MV James R. Barker and Paul R. Tregurtha , she is owned and operated by the Interlake Shipping Company.

In spite of its size the MV Mesabi Miner is able to maneuver, in harbor, without requiring assistance from tugboats.

On the morning of January 5, 2014, U.S. Coast Guard Cutter Hollyhock was breaking ice for the lake freighter MV Mesabi Miner approximately 22 nautical miles west of the Straits of Mackinac.  She slowed after encountering harder ice and was struck in the stern by the much larger ore carrier.  Both vessels sustained damage but there were no injuries, release of pollutants, or reports of flooding.

External links
 Official M/V Mesabi Miner Webpage

References

1975 ships
Great Lakes freighters
Ships built in Lorain, Ohio